Artsyom Buloychyk (born 16 June 1992) is a Belarusian professional football coach and a former player. He is an assistant coach with Russian club Baltika Kaliningrad.

Honours
Minsk
Belarusian Cup winner: 2012–13

External links

1992 births
Living people
Belarusian footballers
Belarus under-21 international footballers
Association football midfielders
Belarusian expatriate footballers
Expatriate footballers in Latvia
Belarusian Premier League players
FC Dinamo Minsk players
FC Minsk players
FC Bereza-2010 players
FC Dnepr Mogilev players
FC Luch Minsk (2012) players
FC Torpedo Minsk players
FC Krumkachy Minsk players
FC Gomel players
People from Babruysk
Sportspeople from Mogilev Region
Belarusian football managers